Jesuit priests at the time of their solemn and final profession in the Society of Jesus promise to "never strive or ambition, not even indirectly, to be chosen or promoted to any prelacy or dignity in or outside the Society; and I will do my best never to consent to my election unless I am forced to do so by obedience to him who can order me under penalty of sin." (Constitutions S.J., Part X, N°6 [817])
  
Yet because of various reasons and in different circumstances—for example, need of a bishop in an area where the Church has still to be developed, recognition of a theologian's outstanding contribution to theological reflection, etc.—several Jesuits have been made bishops or even cardinals. In such cases they remain only nominally Jesuit, as they lose active and passive voice within the Order and are no longer under the obedience of the Superior General. In 2013 the first Jesuit pope was elected, Pope Francis.

The following is a complete list of contemporary living Jesuit cardinals. Three of them are above 80 years of age and thus are ineligible as a papal elector. Another four are not yet above the age of 80 and thus are currently eligible to serve as papal electors.

+ The last Jesuit Cardinals to die were Ján Chryzostom Korec, who died on October 24, 2015, and Albert Vanhoye, who died on July 29, 2021.

References